Michael Dawson may refer to:

 Michael Dawson (footballer) (born 1983), English footballer
 Michael Dawson (Lost), fictional character in Lost
 Michael Dawson (businessman), Irish businessman and former senator
 Michael Dawson (canoeist) (born 1986), New Zealand slalom canoeist
 Mick Dawson, Irish businessman and rugby executive
 Mike Dawson (cartoonist) (born 1975), American cartoonist
 Mike Dawson (American football) (1953–2008), American football defensive lineman
 Mike Dawson, the protagonist of the video games Dark Seed and Dark Seed II
 Michael Dawson, visual effects artist, see Academy Award for Best Visual Effects
 Michael Dawson, executive producer of the TV series Vera
 Michael Dawson (political scientist), American political scientist
 Mike Dawson (politician), Progressive Conservative MLA-elect for Southwest Miramichi-Bay du Vin